Yury Yevgenyevich Zaostrovtsev (in , born 1956) is a Russian security services official and businessman. He is a son of Yevgeny Zaostrovtsev, former Chief of the Karelian KGB Directorate.

Until 1993 Yury Zaostrovtsev also had worked in KGB and its successors. In 1998–2004 he served in the Federal Security Service (FSB), in 2000–2004 as a First deputy Director and the Head of the Economic Security Department. Since August 2000 he has been a member of the board of directors of Sovkomflot. In 2004–2007 he was a first deputy chairman of the board of directors of Vneshekonombank.

See also 
 Three Whales Corruption Scandal

References 

Russian politicians
Russian bankers
KGB officers
1956 births
Living people
Russian businesspeople in transport